Zhytomyr is a city in the north of the western half of Ukraine. It is the administrative center of Zhytomyr Oblast (province), as well as the administrative center of the surrounding Zhytomyr Raion (district). The city of Zhytomyr is not a part of Zhytomyr Raion: the city itself is designated as its own separate raion within the oblast; moreover Zhytomyr consists of two so-called "raions in a city": Bohunskyi Raion and Koroliovskyi Raion (named in honour of Sergey Korolyov). Its population is 

Zhytomyr is a major transport hub. The city lies on a historic route linking the city of Kyiv with the west through Brest. Today it links Warsaw with Kyiv, Minsk with Izmail, and several major cities of Ukraine.

Important economic activities of Zhytomyr include lumber milling, food processing, granite quarrying, metalworking, and the manufacture of musical instruments.

Zhytomyr Oblast is the main center of the Polish minority in Ukraine, and in the city itself there is a Latin Catholic cathedral and large Roman Catholic Polish cemetery, founded in 1800. It is regarded as the third biggest Polish cemetery outside Poland, after the Lychakivskiy Cemetery in Lviv and Rasos Cemetery in Vilnius.

History 

Legend holds that Zhytomyr was established about 884 by Zhytomyr, prince of a Slavic tribe of Drevlians. This date, 884, is cut into a large stone of the ice age times, standing on the hill where Zhytomyr was founded. Zhytomyr was one of the prominent cities of Kievan Rus'. The first records of the town date from 1240, when it was sacked by the Mongol hordes of Batu Khan.

In 1320 Zhytomyr was captured by the Grand Duchy of Lithuania and received Magdeburg rights in 1444. After the Union of Lublin (1569) the city was incorporated into the Crown of the Polish Kingdom and in 1667, following the Treaty of Andrusovo, it became the capital of the Kiev Voivodeship. In the Second Partition of Poland in 1793 it passed to Imperial Russia and became the capital of the Volhynian Governorate.
u
Following the Union of Lublin, Zhytomyr became an important center of local administration, seat of the starosta, and capital of Zhytomyr County. Here, sejmiks of Kiev Voivodeship took place. In 1572, the town had 142 buildings, a manor house of the starosta and a castle. Following the privilege of King Sigismund III Vasa, Zhytomyr had the right for two fairs a year.

During Khmelnytsky Uprising (1648) Zhytomyr was incorporated into Cossack Hetmanate state.

In 1667, Zhytomyr became capital of Kiev Voivodeship, and in 1724, a Jesuit school and monastery were opened here. By 1765, Zhytomyr had five churches, including 3 Roman Catholic and 2 Orthodox, and 285 houses.

In 1793 Zhytomyr was incorporated into the Russian Empire, and in 1804 was named capital of the Volhynian Governorate.

During a brief period of Ukrainian independence (1917-1920) in 1918 the city was for a few weeks the national capital of Ukrainian People's Republic. Ultimately Ukrainian fight for independence failed and Ukrainian People's Republic became occupied by Soviet Union. A new Soviet Ukraine state was formed under Soviet rule - Ukrainian Soviet Socialist Republic. From 1920 Zhytomyr was a part of Ukrainian Soviet Socialist Republic.

During World War II Zhytomyr and the surrounding territory was, for two and a half years (first from 9 July 1941 to 12 November 1943, and again from 19 November 1943 to 31 December 1943) under Nazi German occupation and was Heinrich Himmler's Ukrainian headquarters. The Nazi regime in what they called the "Zhytomyr General District" became what historian Wendy Lower describes asa laboratory for… Himmler's resettlement activists… the elimination of the Jews and German colonization of the East—transformed the landscape and devastated the population to an extent that was not experienced in other parts of Nazi-occupied Europe besides Poland. [While]… [u]ltimately, the exigencies of the war effort and mounting partisan warfare behind the lines prevented Nazi leaders from fully developing and realizing their colonial aims in Ukraine… In addition to the immediate destruction of all Jewish communities, Himmler insisted that the Ukrainian civilian population be brought to a 'minimum.'

During 1942-1949 Zhytomyr region was a territory of mild Ukrainian Insurgent Army (UPA) activity (UPA North), who fought for Independence of Ukraine against Nazi Germany and Soviet Union.

After Soviet Union defeated Nazi Germany, Zhytomyr fell under Soviet rule and became a part of Ukrainian Soviet Socialist Republic again.

On 24 August 1991 Ukrainian parliament announced Declaration of Independence of Ukraine. From 1991, Zhytomyr has been part of the independent and sovereign Ukraine.

2022 Russian invasion 

During the 2022 Russian invasion of Ukraine, Zhytomyr and the surrounding area were subjected to several Russian air and missile strikes, such as the 2 March airstrike which damaged residential buildings, a thermal electricity plant, and two hospitals, killing at least two and injuring more than a dozen.

Administrative division 
The city is divided into two administrative districts:

Microdistrict

The city of Zhytomyr contains the following areas (microdistricts):

 Bohunia 
 Hydropark 
 Hinchanka the Second 
 Zavokzalny district
 Railway station area
 Korbutivka
 Kroshnia
 Maliovanka
 Marianivka
 Pavlykivka
 Putiatynka
 Rudnia
 Smokivka
 Smolianka
 Sokolova Hora
 Old Town
 Eastern microdistrict (folk name Poliova)
 Khmilnyki (folk name Malikova)
 Center

Population

Demographic history

Roman Catholics 
Zhytomyr had been a Latin Catholic bishopric since 1321, until the see was suppressed in 1789 in favor of the Diocese of Lutsk and Zytomierz, until that was split up again in 1925, when it was restored as the Roman Catholic Diocese of Zhytomyr; that was formally suppressed in 1998 to establish the Diocese of Kyïv–Žytomyr, but actually the city retains the episcopal see in its Cathedral of the Holy Wisdom, while Kyiv (although first in the title and the national capital) only has a co-cathedral.

The Zhytomyr cemetery was opened in 1800. At first, it served Polish nobility from Volhynia, such as the Czeczel and the Woronicz families. Later, other Catholics were buried here, including Germans, Ukrainians and Russians.

In 1840, the Chapel of St. Stanislaus was built (now in ruins), and the cemetery was divided into nine districts, named after different saints. In the Soviet Union, the complex was devastated, now it is under the process of renovation.

Among most famous people buried here are: 
 Bronislaw Matyjewicz-Maciejewicz, one of the first Polish air pilots
 Karol Niedzialkowski - bishop of Lutsk and Zhytomir in the late 19th century
 Apolinary Wnukowski - Roman Catholic archbishop and scholar
 Juliusz Zarębski - Polish composer
 parents of Ignacy Jan Paderewski
 the family of Stanisław Moniuszko

Jews in Zhytomyr 

Zhytomyr apparently had few Jews at the time of the Khmelnytsky Uprising (1648), but by the time it became part of Russia in 1778, it had a large Jewish community, and was a center of the Hasidic movement. Jews formed nearly one-third of the 1861 population (13,299 in 40,564); thirty years later, they had somewhat outpaced the general growth of the city, with 24,062 Jews in a total population of 69,785. By 1891 there were three large synagogues and 46 smaller batei midrash. The proportion of Jews was much lower in the surrounding district of Zhytomyr than in the city itself; at the turn of the century (circa 1900) there were 22,636 Jews in a total population of 281,378.

In Imperial Russia, Zhytomyr held the same status as the official Jewish center of southern part of the Pale of Settlement as Vilnius held in the north. The printing of Hebrew books was permitted only in these two cities during the monopoly of Hebrew printing from 1845 to 1862, and both were chosen as the seats of the two rabbinical schools which were established by the government in 1848 in pursuance of its plans to force secular education on the Jews of Russia in accordance with the program of the Teutonized Russian Haskalah movement. The rabbinical school of Zhytomyr was considered the more Jewish, or rather the less Russianized, of the two (Ha-Meliẓ, 1868, No. 40, cited in Jewish Encyclopedia). Its first head master was Jacob Eichenbaum, who was succeeded by Hayyim Selig Slonimski in 1862. The latter remained at the head of the school until it was closed (together with the one at Vilnius) in 1873 because of its failure to provide rabbis with a secular education who should be acceptable to the Jewish communities. Suchastover, Gottlober, Lerner, and Zweifel were among the best-known teachers of the rabbinical school at Zhytomyr, while Abraham Goldfaden, Salomon Mandelkern, and Abraham Jacob Paperna were among the students who later became famous in the Jewish world.

The Jewish community of Zhytomyr suffered pogroms:
On 7–8 May 1905, when the section of the city known as "Podol" was devastated, and 20 were killed within the city.
On 7–10 January 1919, 15 young Jewish neighbors were killed when they came to defend, and the Christian student Nicholas Blinov, also attempting to defend, likewise died. Ten young Jews from nearby Chudnov were also killed while on their way to aid the Jews of Zhytomyr.
Beginning on 22 March 1919, according to witnesses, the 317 deaths were fewer than might have been, due to both Christian sheltering efforts and the return of the Bolshevik troops within a few days.

The Jewish community of the region was largely destroyed in the Holocaust. In the four months beginning with Himmler's 25 July 1942 orders, "all of Ukraine's shtetls and ghettos lay in ruins; around 3,000 Jewish men, women, and children were murdered by stationary and mobile SS-police units with local Ukrainian auxiliaries."

Today, the Zhytomyr Jewish community numbers about 5,000. The community is a part of the "Union of Jewish Communities in Ukraine" and the city and district's rabbinate. Rabbi Shlomo Vilhelm, who came to the city as a Chabad emissary in 1994, serves as rabbi. Other Jewish institutions are also active in the city, including the Joint and its humanitarian branch "Chesed" and the Jewish Agency.

The community has an ancient synagogue in the city center which has a mikveh. Chabad operates in the city various educational institutions which have residence in a village next to the city.

Culture 
The city has 2 state theaters and a philharmonic, more than 10 museums, libraries and planetarium.

One of the world-famous museums of cosmonautics Serhiy Pavlovych Korolyov Museum of Cosmonautics is located in the city.

Theaters and music

In 1809, the first stationary theater building was built in Zhytomyr on the initiative of Volyn governor M. I. Кomburley.

In 1858, the first stone theater in Ukraine was built (now it houses the regional state philharmonic). M. Kropyvnytskyi, M. Zankovetska, V. Komisarzhevska, I. Aldridge, P. Viardot performed here.

In 1966, a new theater building was built with a large auditorium for 943 seats and a small one for 70 seats, a lobby with an area of 550 m2, rehearsal halls, dressing rooms, offices, production shops.

Currently in the city work:

 Academic Ukrainian Music and Drama Theater named after Ivan Kocherga;
 Academic Regional Puppet Theater;
 Philharmonic named after Svyatoslav Richter.
Since 1973, the Zhytomyr Academic Dance Ensemble "Sun" exists in the city.

The internationally renowned chamber choir OREYA is based in the city.

Famous composers Borys Lyatoshynsky and Sviatoslav Richter were born in Zhytomyr.

Museums

The following museums operate in Zhytomyr:

 historical and local lore museum;
 art gallery;
museum of nature;
V. G. Korolenko Literary Memorial Museum;
memorial house-museum of academician Sergei Korolev;
literary museum of Zhytomyr Region;
museum of the history of fire protection;
Sergei Pavlovich Korolyov Museum of Cosmonautics.
Libraries

 Zhytomyr Regional Universal Scientific Library named after O. Olzhych;
Zhytomyr Regional Scientific Medical Library; 
Zhytomyr Regional Library for Youth; 
Zhytomyr Regional Library for Children. 
Architecture: sights and monuments

The city has 74 historical monuments, 24 archeological monuments, and 15 monuments of monumental art (one of which is of national importance). Monuments of architecture and urban planning of state importance — 10, local significance — 72.

Monuments of historical, cultural and religious significance in the city of Zhytomyr include:

 Cells of the Jesuit monastery (1724);
 Holy Dormition Bishops Cathedral in Podil (1874);
Church of St. James;
Seminary Church of St. John of Dukla;
Saint Sophia Cathedral;
St. Michael's Cathedral;
Holy Exaltation of the Cross Cathedral;
Transfiguration Cathedral;
Lutheran Church;
Water tower.
In 1996, the Memorial to the Victims of Fascism was erected in Bohunia by the sculptor Yosyp Tabachnyk (a memorable location of the Bohunіa concentration camp for prisoners of war).

Geography 

Zhytomyr lies in a unique natural setting; all sides of the city are surrounded by ancient forests through which flow the Teteriv, Kamianka, Kroshenka and Putiatynka rivers. The Teteriv river generally forms the southern boundary of Zhytomyr, though there are also some small areas of Zhytomyr city territory below the southern bank of the river. The city is rich in parks and public squares.

Zhytomyr is set out on a mostly radial type of street net with the centre at the main public square of the city, named Sobornyi Maidan (which means Cathedral Square). A building containing courts and some other institutions is in the west of the square. Before 1991, this building contained Zhytomyr Oblast Committee of the Communist Party. Just behind the building (that is to the west of Sobornyi Square) is a small quiet park, bearing the name of Zamkova Gora (Castle Mountain) and containing a monument-type boulder with an inscription stating that this is a place where Zhytomyr was founded. This historical centre of Zhytomyr is in the south part of the city. The old part of Zhytomyr is on three rocky hills over the river Kamianka: Okhrimova, Zamkova, and Petrovska.

The old town is surrounded by new housing estates, the names of which are often borrowed from the former suburban villages or reflect the longstanding occupations common in these places. The main streets connecting Sobornyi Maidan with the outskirts of Zhytomyr are Kyivska Street or Kyiv Street (going to northeast, to the railway station and also to the main bus station of the city), Velyka Berdychivska Street (going to southeast), Lech Kaczyński Street (going southwest; its further continuation is Chudnivska Street going to beaches and a forest-type park near the river of Teteriv), and Peremohy Street (going north).

The best-known street in the central part of Zhytomyr is Mykhailivska (named after St. Michael's Church at the northern end of the street). The street is about 500 metres to the east of Sobornyi Maidan and runs approximately from north to south, connecting some points at the above-mentioned Kyivska Street and Velyka Berdychivska. Mykhailivska Street is for pedestrian traffic: vehicles are forbidden, with the exception of some slow-moving ones. A puppet theatre is nestled in the middle of the street, while the building of the Zhytomyr City Council is at its southern end. Several small coffee houses and cafés have sprung up here recently, frequented by locals from all walks of life and of all ages. If one crosses Velyka Berdychivska Street from the southern end of Mykhailivska Street, then one finds oneself at Korolyov Square containing the building of the Zhytomyr Oblast Council. Crossing Kyivska Street from the northern end of Mykhailivska Street, one can continue to go along Pokrovska Street, another important long avenue of Zhytomyr (going north).

The best-known park of Zhytomyr is named after Yuri Gagarin, in the south of the city, at the left (northern) bank of the Teteriv River. It was formerly owned by the Baron de Chaudoir.

Climate

Economy 

Zhytomyr is an important economic center in the region. Enterprises in the city include glass, metal fabrication, electronic devices, screens, fabrics, furniture, shoes and others.
In addition, there is a large pharmaceutical factory in Zhytomyr. Since 1944, a confectionery factory (ALC "ZhL") has operated in Zhytomyr; the enterprise is one of the leaders of the Ukrainian confectionery market.

The city is home to the Zhytomyr Armored Factory. The factory has been one of the main repair facilities in Ukraine since the start of the Russo-Ukrainian War, running on 3 shifts. In September 2014 it was announced that the Ministry of Defence of Ukraine had placed a ₴280 million order with the factory.

Current social situation 
In December 2006, the Austrian Jesuit Georg Sporschill, who was previously active in the Republic of Moldova, founded the first of 3 care centers for street children.

Transport 

In ancient times, the city was on the important road from Kyiv to the city of Brest-Litovsk. 
Now this road is of international highway   connecting Kyiv to the Hungarian border near Chop.
Some other roads:
   connecting the cities Roman and Zhytomyr (through Vinnytsia)
  Zhytomyr - Chernivtsi (through Khmelnytskyi)
  Zhytomyr - Stavyshche (through Skvyra)
  Zhytomyr - checkpoint "Vystupovychi" of the Ukrainian-Belarusian border (through Korosten).

Railways connect Koziatyn with Zhytomyr (through Berdychiv), Korosten, Zviahel, Korostyshiv and Fastiv. In 2011 a stretch of the Fastiv — Zhytomyr rail line was electrified.
Zhytomyr is about 131 kilometers from Kyiv (by road 140 km, by rail 165 km).

The following trains pass through Zhytomyr train station (both directions for all):
 Zhytomyr - Korosten
 Vinnytsia - Korosten
 Zhytomyr - Korostyshiv
 Korosten - Koziatyn
 Zhytomyr - Koziatyn
 Zhytomyr - Zviahel
 Zhytomyr - Fastiv

The city has an airport (however, it is not currently being used for passenger transport; it is intended for the use of strategic bombers, though not currently being used).

Zhytomyr has three bus stations connecting it with many other cities and villages in Ukraine and abroad.
Zhytomyr has fifteen bridges and junctions built over rivers and roads. There is a 30-kilometer ring road around Zhytomyr.
The most interesting bridge in Zhytomyr is one over the Teteriv River in Gagarin Park (named after Yuri Gagarin).

Public city transport 
Common kinds of public transport shuttling within Zhytomyr are trolleybuses, buses, and minibuses. There are also electric trams, but on one route only. Earlier there were several tram routes in Zhytomyr, but all excepting one were canceled during a period of domination of the opinion that a tram is a bad kind of transport.
Trams began to shuttle in Zhytomyr in 1899. Thus Zhytomyr became the 5th city with electric trams within the territory of present-day Ukraine. Trolleybuses appear in Zhytomyr in 1962.
The total length of Zhytomyr city electric transport routes (trolleybuses and trams) is 275 km. Zhytomyr is the first city in Ukraine to implement e-ticket system in all municipal public transport.

Attack on Zhytomyr 

On 27 February 2022, the city's public airport Zhytomyr Airport was directly attacked by 2 Iskander missiles launched from Belarus, during the Russian invasion of Ukraine, which had recently started three days prior to the attack on Zhytomyr Airport.

Twin towns – sister cities

Zhytomyr is twinned with:

 Bytom, Poland
 Dazhou, China

 Kutaisi, Georgia
 Montana, Bulgaria
 Płock, Poland
 Shangla, Pakistan

Notable people 

 Ossip Bernstein (1882–1962), Russian-French Grandmaster chess player and businessman
 Aleksandr Bezymensky (1898–1973), a Soviet poet, screenwriter and journalist.
 Sasha Boole (born 1989), Ukrainian country and folk musician, and singer / songwriter
 Tadeusz Borowski (1922–1951), a Polish writer and journalist.
 Ina Bourskaya (1886—1954), an American opera singer.
 Jarosław Dąbrowski (1836–1871), Polish nobleman and Paris Commune revolutionary
 Boris Didkovsky (1883–1937) Bolshevik revolutionary, Soviet geologist and University rector 
 Oksana Dyka (born 1978), a Ukrainian operatic soprano.
 Luis Filcer (1927–2018), a Mexican Expressionist painter dealing with injustice and struggle.
 Samuel Freedman (1908–1993), Canadian judge, Manitoba Chief Justice
 Yakov Gamarnik (1894–1937), Soviet Communist militant and military commander
 Jewgeni Grischbowski (born 1992), a Dj and Music Producer.
 Vladimir Hachinski (born ca.1945), clinical neuroscientist and researcher into stroke and dementia.
 Mark Kharitonov (born 1937) a Russian novelist, poet and essayist
 Alexander Kipnis (1891–1978), German then US bass opera singer 
 Vladimir Korolenko (1853–1921), Russian writer, journalist and human rights activist
 Sergei Korolev (1907–1966), rocket engineer and designer, head of the Soviet space program
 Keni Liptzin (1856–1918), Jewish actress in Yiddish theatre
 Borys Lyatoshynsky (1895–1968), a Ukrainian composer, conductor and teacher.
 Julian Movchan (1913–2002), a Ukrainian-American journalist, writer and doctor.
 Donia Nachshen (1903–1987) a British book illustrator, produced gov't posters in WWII.
 Franciszek Niepokólczycki (1900–1974), a colonel of Polish Army.
 Oleh Olzhych (1907-1944), Ukrainian writer and nationalist militant
 Abram Ranovich (1885–1948), Soviet scholar of classical antiquity and religion. 
 Sviatoslav Richter (1915–1997), a distinguished Soviet pianist
 Michael Rostovtzeff (1870–1952), a Russian historian and archaeologist
 Esther Salaman (1900–1995), a Russian-born Jewish writer and physicist. 
 Igor Shafarevich (1923–2017), a Soviet and Russian mathematician, did algebraic number theory
 David Shterenberg (1881–1948), a Russian Soviet painter and graphic artist.
 Apollon Skalkowski (1808-1898), Russian and Ukrainian scientist, historian, writer and publisher
 Andriy Slyusarchuk (born 1971) a Ukrainian mnemonist and fraudster
 Mykola Stsiborskyi (1897–1941), leader of the Organization of Ukrainian Nationalists
 Vladimir Veksler (1907–1966), an experimental physicist, pioneer of the particle accelerator
 Natalia Vlaschenko (born 1960), journalist, screenwriter, TV presenter, playwright and columnist.
 Bruno Zach (1891–1935), an Austrian art deco sculptor of Genre art
 Casimir Zagourski (1883–1944), a Polish photographer active in Central Africa 1924–44
 Juliusz Zarębski (1854–1885), a Polish composer and pianist.
 Zev Wolf of Zhitomyr (died 1798), an Hassidic Rabbi.

Sport 

 Anastasiya Chernenko (born 1990), a professional triathlete
 Aderinsola Eseola (born 1991), a Ukrainian footballer with over 200 club caps
 Ruslan Malinovskyi (born 1993) a Ukrainian footballer with over 300 club caps and 49 for Ukraine
 Viktor Rudyi (born 1962), a retired Soviet and Ukrainian football player with 510 club caps.
 Vyacheslav Shabranskyy (born 1987), boxer, fought for the WBO light-heavyweight title in 2017.
 Danylo Sikan (born 2001), a Ukrainian footballer with over 50 club caps and 6 for Ukraine
 Andriy Tkachuk (born 1987), a Ukrainian football midfielder with over 400 club caps
 Yuriy Vernydub (born 1966), a Ukrainian football coach and former player with 462 club caps.

and from Zhytomyr Oblast 
 Rustam Akhmetov (born 1950 in Berdychiv), a retired high jumper who represented the Soviet Union.
 Hayim Nahman Bialik (1873 in Ivnytsia – 1934), Hebrew poet, educated in Zhytomyr
 Adolpho Bloch (1908 in Jitomir - 1995), Brazilian-Ukrainian media magnate
 Moisey Kasyanik (1911 in Novo-Zhitomyr – 1988), weightlifter

Gallery

References

Sources 

 
 Wendy Lower, Nazi Empire-Building and the Holocaust in Ukraine, 2005, University of North Carolina Press. . Introduction (online)  accessed 19 July 2006.

Sources and external links 
 
 Zhytomyr Journal - news, photo, map and other 
Zhytomyr business directory (in Russian or Ukrainian)
 GCatholic - Latin Catholic bishopric
 interesniy.zhitomir.ua - a blog about history of Zhytomyr 
 GCatholic - Latin Catholic cathedral
 
 Zhytomyr map - cafes, bars, restaurants, everything about the city 
 hotels of Zhytomyr

 
Cities in Zhytomyr Oblast
Zhytomyr Raion
Zhitomirsky Uyezd
Kiev Voivodeship
Shtetls
Cities of regional significance in Ukraine
Holocaust locations in Ukraine
880s establishments
Populated places established in the 9th century
Oblast centers in Ukraine